The Hochgolling (2,862 m) is a mountain of the Eastern Alps, located on the border of Steiermark and Salzburg, Austria, near the ski resort of Schladming. It is the highest peak of the Lower Tauern range.

A hiking rather than a climbing peak, the mountain is relatively low by alpine standards, but still towers over all of its neighbours. Its northern face is a 1,200 m high wall, while its other slopes are more gentle. A long ridge slopes south from the summit, dividing the Göriach Valley from the Lessach Valley.

Due to Hochgolling's topographic isolation the views from its summit are panoramic, stretching from the glaciated peaks of the vast High Tauern in the west to the lower Gurktal Alps to the east, and including the Julian Alps, Kamnik Alps and Karawanks to the south.

References

External links 

 Hochgolling on www.summitpost.org

Two-thousanders of Austria
Mountains of the Alps
Mountains of Styria
Mountain ranges of Salzburg (state)
Schladming Tauern